Tom Hess (born December 13, 1969) is a professional bowler from Urbandale, Iowa, and is a member of the Professional Bowlers Association (PBA). He now bowls out of Granger, Iowa.

Bowling career
Hess won the 2011 USBC Masters for not only his first major title, but his first-ever PBA Tour victory.  This victory earned him $50,000.

He was the 2003 PBA Midwest Region Rookie of the Year, the 2010–11 PBA Midwest Region Player of the Year, and a three-time Iowa state champion.

Hess joined the PBA50 Tour (for players age 50 and older) in 2020, but that season was cancelled due to the COVID-19 pandemic, making 2021 Tom's rookie season. On September 7, 2021, Hess won the PBA50 Senior U.S. Open with a convincing 256–209 victory over PBA Hall of Famer Chris Barnes in the title match. This gave Hess a major title on each of the PBA and PBA50 Tours. On September 19, Hess won his second PBA50 major title at the USBC Senior Masters. Qualifying as the #4 seed, Hess defeated #5 seed Donnie Hogue in the opening match, then went on to defeat three PBA Hall of Famers (Pete Weber, Doug Kent and Chris Barnes) on his way to the title. In the process, Hess wrapped up PBA50 Rookie of the Year and PBA50 Player of the Year honors, becoming the third player (after Tom Baker and Norm Duke) to win both awards in the same season. Hess also joined Dave Soutar and Walter Ray Williams Jr. as the only players in history to win both the USBC Masters and USBC Senior Masters in a career.

Hess participated in the 2022 PBA Tournament of Champions, and was the only senior player to make it to the match play round. On July 3, 2022, Hess won his third PBA50 Tour title at the Highland Park Lanes Open in Greeley, Colorado.

Hess is currently sponsored by Storm Bowling, having previously been a member of the Brunswick pro staff.

Professional titles
Major titles are in bold.

PBA Tour titles
 2011 USBC Masters (Reno, NV)

PBA50 Tour titles
 2021 PBA50 Senior U.S. Open (Brentwood, CA)
 2021 USBC Senior Masters (Las Vegas, NV)
 2022 PBA50 Highland Park Lanes Open (Greeley, CO)

Personal
Hess also works in the sod industry, and is now an analyst/color commentator for live PBA tournament coverage on BowlTV, the USBC's YouTube channel.

References

External links
 Tom Hess: player profileProfessional Bowlers Association

American ten-pin bowling players
People from Urbandale, Iowa
1969 births
Living people